Adnan Kandhar (born 5 February 1986) is a Pakistani photographer, cinematographer and music video director. He is best known for his music videos "Main Sufi Hun" (2013) for which he earned a nomination of Best Music Video Director at 13th Lux Style Awards and Won Best Music Video at 2nd Hum Awards. Kandhar got his second nomination at 3rd Hum Awards for "Shikva" (2014) in the same category. In 2015, Adnan won his first Best Music Video Director award at 14th Lux Style Awards.

Early life and education
Kandhar was born in Jamshoro Hyderabad, Sindh. He received his early education in Hyderabad, Sindh and went on to receive his degree in arts from National College of Arts (NCA) Lahore, Punjab.

Filmography

Music videos

OST

Music Shows

TV Commercial

Documentary

Awards and nominations

TV Commercials

References

External links 
  (Personal profile)
   

1986 births
Living people
Pakistani music video directors
Pakistani photographers
Pakistani cinematographers
Hum Award winners
National College of Arts alumni